East Hanover is the name of the following places in the United States of America:

East Hanover Township, New Jersey
East Hanover Township, Dauphin County, Pennsylvania
East Hanover Township, Lebanon County, Pennsylvania

See also
Hanover, the German city
Hanover (disambiguation) for other places called Hanover